Project 596, (Miss Qiu (Qiū Xiǎojiě) as the callsign, Chic-1 by the US intelligence agencies) was the first nuclear weapons test conducted by the People's Republic of China, detonated on 16 October 1964, at the Lop Nur test site. It was a uranium-235 implosion fission device made from weapons-grade uranium (U-235) enriched in a gaseous diffusion plant in Lanzhou.  

The atomic bomb was a part of China's "Two Bombs, One Satellite" program. It had a yield of 22 kilotons, comparable to the Soviet Union's first nuclear bomb RDS-1 in 1949 and the American Fat Man bomb dropped on Nagasaki, Japan in 1945. With the test, China became the fifth nuclear power in the world and the first Asian nation to possess nuclear capability. This was the first of 45 successful nuclear tests China conducted between 1964 and 1996, all of which occurred at the Lop Nur test site.

Development

Motivation 
The Chinese nuclear weapons program was initiated on 15 January 1955. The decision made by the Chinese leadership was prompted by confrontations with the United States in the 1950s, including the Korean War, the 1955 Taiwan Straits Crisis, nuclear blackmail, and eventually the Vietnam War as well. Mao Zedong explained his decision to a gathering of the Politburo of the Chinese Communist Party in 1956:

"Now we're already stronger than we were in the past, and in the future we'll be even stronger than now. Not only are we going to have more airplanes and artillery, but also the atomic bomb. In today's world, if we don't want to be bullied, we have to have this thing."

Mao was confident that nuclear weapon capabilities would allow China to assert its "national will" toward policy goals and deter threats to national security.

Design and testing 
The Soviet Union helped with some initial research, design, and production preparations. However, it later withdrew support at the last minute, and China had to rely on itself to complete the bomb.

In 1956, the Third Ministry of Machinery Building was established, and nuclear research was conducted at the Institute of Physics and Atomic Energy in Beijing. A gaseous diffusion uranium enrichment plant was constructed in Lanzhou. In 1957, China and the USSR signed an agreement on sharing defense technology that involved an atomic bomb prototype being supplied by Moscow to Beijing, technical data, and an exchange of hundreds of Russian and Chinese scientists. A joint search for uranium in China was conducted between the two countries. A location near Lake Lop Nur in Xinjiang was selected to be the test site with its headquarters at Malan. Construction of the test site began on 1 April 1960, involving tens of thousands of laborers and prisoners under tough conditions. It took four years to complete. Being the sole site for nuclear testing in China for years to come, the Lop Nur test site underwent extensive expansion and is by far the world's largest nuclear weapons test site, covering around 100,000 square kilometers.

Sino-Soviet relations cooled during 1958 to 1959. China was upset by the lack of Soviet assistance in quelling the Tibetan uprisings in 1959 and against the escape of the Dalai Lama to India. The Soviet Union later refused support for China in the Sino-Indian War of 1962. Khrushchev was unnerved at Mao's relatively nonchalant view on nuclear war. The Soviet Union was also engaged in test ban negotiations with the United States in 1959 in order to relax Soviet-American tensions, directly inhibiting the delivery of a prototype to China. Broader disagreements between Soviet and Chinese communist ideologies escalated mutual criticism. The Soviets responded by withdrawing the delivery of a prototype bomb and over 1,400 Russian advisers and technicians involved in 200 scientific projects in China meant to foster cooperation between the two countries. 

Project 596 was named after the month of June 1959 in which it was initiated as an independent nuclear project, immediately after Nikita Khrushchev decided to stop helping the Chinese with their nuclear program on 20 June 1959, and Mao shifted toward an overall policy of self-reliance. By 14 January 1964, enough fissionable U-235 had been successfully enriched from the Lanzhou plant. On 16 October 1964, a uranium-235 fission implosion device, weighing 1550 kilograms was detonated on a 102-meter tower.

Reception

United States 

The United States government was aware of Soviet support of a Chinese nuclear program, but after the Soviets withdrew support in 1959, some U.S. officials underestimated the sole capability of China to develop a nuclear weapon, and were surprised when China proved them wrong. Namely, they thought there was an insufficient source for weapons-grade U-235 production and that the significance of a nuclear China was underplayed. Still, President Kennedy proposed preventive action but it was decided against by the U.S. government as it was "likely to be viewed as provocative and dangerous and will play into the hands of efforts by [Beijing] to picture U.S. hostility to Communist China as the source of tensions and the principal threat to the peace in Asia." By early 1964, from surveillance of activity around the Lop Nur site, it was clear that a test would be imminent.

The next step for China was to develop the mode of delivery of a nuclear payload. Just eight months after the 596 test, a deliverable nuclear bomb was successfully dropped from a bomber and detonated. A year later, medium range missiles were fitted with nuclear warheads. The Lop Nur test site was used to develop more sophisticated nuclear weapons such as the hydrogen bomb, multi-stage thermonuclear devices, and Intercontinental Ballistic Missiles (ICBM). While China's nuclear arsenal was modest compared to that of the Soviet Union and the United States, the presence of another nuclear power in Asia raised the issue of uncontrolled proliferation. The USA took measures to forestall the independent development of nuclear capabilities in more Asian nations, most immediately with India. Top U.S. officials began open talks of non-proliferation with the Soviet Union soon after the 596 test to offset the possibility of a nuclear China propelling a larger and more unpredictable global arms race.

Soviet Union 
Chinese nuclear capacity prompted the Soviet Union to sign the 1968 Treaty on the Non-Proliferation of Nuclear Weapons with the United States as well as China.

Japan 
While the 1964 Summer Olympics which opened on 10 October was already underway in Tokyo, China conducted the atomic bomb test six days into the competition, prompting serious and immediate concerns of radiation fallout in Japan as it is relatively close to mainland China.

China returns to the United Nations Security Council 

In response to the 596 test, the Chinese Nationalist leadership in Taiwan, including Chiang Kai-shek, called for a military response against Communist Chinese nuclear facilities and the formation of an anti-communist defense organization. However, the United States would not risk strikes in China. Taiwan tried to launch its own nuclear weapons program, but failed, and the U.S. pressured Taiwan to dismantle its nuclear weapons program as it would strain US-China relations. At the time of the test, the United States recognized Taiwan as the seat of the Chinese government, and Chinese membership in the United Nations, including a permanent seat in the United Nations Security Council, was held by Taiwan. With a nuclear weapon in the hands of Beijing, the international community would have to shift its recognition to the mainland, which it did a decade later.

Since the 596 test China has asserted its nuclear doctrine of no-first-use, with officials characterizing the Chinese nuclear arsenal as a minimal deterrent to nuclear attack.

Specifics
 Time: 07:00 GMT 16 October 1964
 Location: Lop Nur Test Ground, about 70 km northwest of Lop Nor dry lake
 Test type and height : Tower, 102 meters
 Yield: 22 kilotons

See also
 Two Bombs, One Satellite
 People's Republic of China and weapons of mass destruction
 RDS-1
 Test No. 6

References

External links
 Chinese Nuclear HistoryA collection of archival materials on the Chinese nuclear weapons program hosted at the Nuclear Proliferation International History Project
 China's Nuclear Weapons from the Nuclear Weapon Archive
 Chinese Nuclear Weapons Program from Atomic Forum

1964 in China
1964 in military history
Chinese nuclear weapons testing
Cold War weapons of China
20th century in Xinjiang
October 1964 events in Asia
China Projects